The Teenagers were a French synth-pop musical trio formed in late 2005, originally as a joke. They achieved some degree of notoriety with the song "Homecoming", both for its catchy sound and for its explicit content. Their debut album Reality Check was released in the UK on 17 March 2008 and 18 March 2008 in the rest of Europe and the United States. On October 12 2020, the band announced that they were no longer active and had not been for some time, and posted a link to a farewell song titled "Do You Remember".

Critical reception
The NME praised the bands "self-aware, smart sentiments, played out against a backdrop of lush, danceable, huggable pop."
They have been said to "sound like Kraftwerk doing the soundtrack to a porno film"
Their music is a mix of an electropop sound, comical lyrics and potent melodies. Their quirky fashion sense is inspired by the eccentric East London style, and copied by their cult fanbase. The track "Homecoming" was elected 4th best song of 2007 by NME.
During 2008 The Teenagers toured the globe (25 countries, 100 cities) to promote their debut album "Reality Check". They played at the Reading Festival (UK), at Glastonbury (UK) and Summersonic (Japan) and have been invited as a support band by Vampire Weekend in the US and Europe.

Discography

Studio albums
 Reality Check (2008)

Extended plays
 The World Is Not Fair EP (2007)

Singles
"Homecoming" (2007)
"Starlett Johansson" (2007)
"Fuck Nicole" (US/Canada only release) (2008)
"Love No" (2008)
"Make It Happen" (2008)
"Made Of" (2010)
"Secret Crush" (2012)
"Do You Remember" (2020)

Remixes
GoodBooks – "The Illness" (2007)
Lo-Fi-Fnk – "City" (2007)
Au Revoir Simone – "Fallen Snow" (2007)
The Black Ghosts – "Face" (2007)
Air – "Mer Du Japon" (2007)
New Young Pony Club – "The Bomb" (2007)
Shiny Toy Guns – "Don't Cry Out" (2007)
Chromeo – "Bonafied Lovin" (2007)
Scanners – "Lowlife"
Goldfrapp – "Happiness" (2008)
Simian Mobile Disco – "It's the Beat" (2008)
Vampire Weekend – "Cape Cod Kwassa Kwassa" (2008)
Britney Spears – "Womanizer" (2008)
Fall Out Boy – "America's Suitehearts" (2008)
Black Gold – "Plans and Reveries" (2008)
Phoenix – "1901" (2009)
Au Revoir Simone – "Shadows" (Unknown)
Kate Nash – "Kiss That Grrrl" (2010)
Alizée – "Les Collines (Never leave you)" (2011)
Solomun – "Forever" (2012)

References

External links
 The Teenagers on Spoonfed
 The Teenagers on Myspace
 Discography on Discogs.com
 Interview at Comfortcomes

2005 establishments in France
French electronic music groups
French indie rock groups
French pop music groups
French indie pop groups
Musical groups established in 2005
Musical groups from Paris
French musical trios
French synthpop groups
XL Recordings artists